Petri Kontiola (born October 4, 1984) is a Finnish professional ice hockey centre currently playing for Ilves of the Liiga. Kontiola has previously played in the National Hockey League (NHL) for the Chicago Blackhawks, the organization that drafted him 196th overall in the 2004 NHL Entry Draft.

Playing career
Kontiola was drafted 196th overall in the 2004 NHL Entry Draft by the Chicago Blackhawks while playing for Tappara in the Finnish SM-liiga. He played professionally for four years with Tappara before making his North American debut for Chicago during the 2007–08 season.

Kontiola started out with the Blackhawks' American Hockey League (AHL) affiliate, the Rockford IceHogs, before playing in his first career NHL game on November 25, 2007, against the Vancouver Canucks.

On March 4, 2009, Kontiola was traded by the Blackhawks, along with James Wisniewski, to the Anaheim Ducks in exchange for Samuel Påhlsson, Logan Stephenson and a conditional draft pick in 2009. He was immediately sent down to the Ducks' AHL affiliate, the Iowa Chops, where he played for the remainder of the 2008–09 season.

On May 26, 2009, Kontiola left North America after signing with Russian club Metallurg Magnitogorsk of the Kontinental Hockey League (KHL) on a two-year contract.

On May 3, 2011, Kontiola signed a two-year contract with KHL rival Traktor Chelyabinsk.

On July 3, 2014, Kontiola bought his release from Traktor and signed a one-year contract as a free agent with the Toronto Maple Leafs. He attended Toronto's training camp but failed to make an impression and on September 29, was assigned to the Toronto Marlies, the Maple Leafs' AHL affiliate. In the 2014–15 season, after 11 scoreless games with the Marlies, Kontiola was placed on unconditional waivers in order to terminate his contract and return to the KHL on November 20. Three days later, Kontiola's KHL rights were traded by Traktor to Lokomotiv Yaroslavl in exchange for Alexei Kruchinin and Yegor Martynov. Kontiola then signed a two-year contract with Yaroslavl on November 28.

After five seasons with Lokomotiv Yaroslavl, Kontiola left as a free agent following the 2018–19 season. He signed a one-year contract to continue in the KHL, returning to Finland to join Jokerit on May 1, 2019.

International play

Kontiola made his international debut for Finland's junior team at the 2004 World Junior Championships in Helsinki, scoring 2 points in 7 games to help earn a bronze medal. He was later named to the men's 2007 IIHF World Championship team in Russia to make his senior debut. He finished among the Finnish leaders with 7 points in 9 games as Finland lost in the final to Canada to earn silver.

Kontiola returned to the Finnish team three year later when he was selected for the 2010 IIHF World Championship tournament held in Germany. In seven games, he scored three goals before Finland was eliminated on May 20, 2010, after Kontiola missed a penalty-shot in the quarterfinal shootout against the Czech Republic.

Kontiola was named to Finnish roster for competition at the 2014 IIHF World Championship.

Kontiola played in the 2021 IIHF World Championship, where he won his third silver medal. His mistake during the overtime period of the gold medal game led to Nick Paul scoring the tournament-winning goal for team Canada.

Career statistics

Regular season and playoffs

International

References

External links

1984 births
Living people
Chicago Blackhawks draft picks
Chicago Blackhawks players
Finnish expatriate ice hockey players in Russia
Finnish ice hockey centres
HPK players
Ice hockey players at the 2014 Winter Olympics
Ilves players
Iowa Stars players
Jokerit players
Lokomotiv Yaroslavl players
Metallurg Magnitogorsk players
Medalists at the 2014 Winter Olympics
Olympic bronze medalists for Finland
Olympic ice hockey players of Finland
Olympic medalists in ice hockey
People from Seinäjoki
Rockford IceHogs (AHL) players
Tappara players
Toronto Marlies players
Traktor Chelyabinsk players
Ice hockey players at the 2018 Winter Olympics
Sportspeople from South Ostrobothnia